Flashlight Brown were a Canadian punk rock band, originally from Guelph, who formed in 1996.

Biography
Bucchino, Conroy, Hughes, and Thomson formed a band, then simply called "Flashlight", out of boredom and frustration and quickly moved from the small college town of Guelph to the much larger Toronto, Ontario. At first, they were unable to get the attention of nightclub owners, so they devised a fictitious talent agency, called  the Harry Wells Booking Agency, which would "represent" them. With the agency as their intermediate, they quickly gained enough recognition to go on tour.

They began touring across Canada in a van. In 1997, they managed to release a self-titled debut album through the Quebec-based Stomp Records, which they would follow up with the Running Season LP two years later. During this time they also managed to film a video for their song "Sonia Bianchi", which received air time on Much Music.

By 2001, the band had established a national touring schedule and had added the word "Brown" to their name, after some pressure from a 1970s funk band called "Flashlight". They then released another self-titled album (under the new name) through Union 2112 (the new version of Stomp, which had recently merged with 2112 Records).

Midway through their 2002 tour, the band was contacted by Rob Cavallo (of Green Day fame), a man who was admired by the band members. Cavallo flew the band to Los Angeles, originally to record a two-song demo, but this quickly turned into a record deal with Hollywood Records. In April 2003, the band released their major label debut, My Degeneration, an album they deemed to be a "culmination of a 6 year career of living on the edge between a dream and despair". The album featured many re-recorded, old favourites along with some new material.

In 2003, the band played over 200 dates in North America. They played various popular festivals such as Warped Tour, Lollapalooza and Snow Jam. In early 2004, they appeared on The Toronto Show.

In 2005, it was announced that they would be recording a new album with Hollywood Records called Blue. The album was completed in early 2006 and the band released two songs, "Save it for Later" and "I'm a Human", on their website. In April, the album was then released in advance on iTunes. The album's release date was then set for June 6.

Also in April 2006, it was announced by Matt Hughes on the Flashlight Brown forums that Mike Conroy would be leaving the band for personal reasons.  Bart Doroz, formerly of The Getaway, was brought in to replace him on guitar.

When June came around, Blue's release was delayed for undisclosed reasons. The nature of the delay has still been left to speculation, however, in early July the band's website went down and their Myspace account had the following message posted:

"Hi all.  Due to extreme differences of opinion, we are no longer with Hollywood Records.  These circumstances  have forced us to cancel all our summer touring.  Apologies to all, especially to those who have been patiently waiting for the release of a record that is 3 years overdue.  The record will come out soon and we will let you know when it becomes available in your country. Thanks for being there for us and we can't wait to play again in your hometown."

In January 2007, a video for the Blue single Sicker was released, followed by the full album. In a generally favourable review, Chart magazine wrote, "It's the kind of pop-rock that isn't merely catchy, it's rewarding after repeated listens." Exclaim!'''s review was more negative, saying, "While the energy and enthusiasm put forth on tracks such as "Sicker", "Get Out Of My Car" and "Party By Myself" is admirable, there’s a distinct stench of immaturity here that detracts from the overall product." The band seemingly went inactive after this release.

DiscographyFlashlight (1997, Stomp Records)Running Season (1999, Stomp Records)Flashlight Brown (2001, Union 2112)Flashlight Brown MadCaddies (Split EP) (2002, Union 2112)My Degeneration (2003, Hollywood Records)Blue (2006, Hollywood Records).

Band members
Fil Bucchino – bass, vocals
Bart Doroz – lead guitar
Matt Hughes – lead vocals, guitar
Tim Thomson – drums.

Former members
Marky Buffone – lead guitar
Mike Conroy – lead guitar
Tristan O'Malley – lead guitar
Andrew McMullen - drums.

Additional information
When playing Dungeons and Dragons earlier in his life, Matt Hughes was always partial to playing a paladin character. 
The band recorded a cover of The Clash's "Should I Stay or Should I Go" for the Rugrats Go Wild! soundtrack, but the track was replaced with "Ready To Roll" instead. The band then released this song online on a secret page of their website.
The band recorded a cover of The Beat's "Save It For Later". This cover is part of the Sky High soundtrack and was later included on their album Blue''.

References

Musical groups established in 1996
Musical groups from Guelph
Canadian pop punk groups
Hollywood Records artists
1996 establishments in Ontario